The 2008–09 Arkansas Razorbacks men's basketball team  represented the University of Arkansas in the 2008–09 college basketball season. The head coach was John Pelphrey, serving for his second year. The team played its home games in Bud Walton Arena in Fayetteville, Arkansas.

2008–09 Roster
Entering the year, the Razorbacks pulled in the 24th best recruiting class of 2008, including ESPNU 100 recruit Rotnei Clarke. Clarke was ranked the sixth-best incoming point guard in the nation by ESPN.

Former Razorbacks football star receiver Marcus Monk returned with a sixth year of eligibility to play basketball for the Hogs. Intending to play both, Monk played 10 games for Stan Heath his freshman year before focusing only on football. Although picked in the 2008 NFL Draft by the Chicago Bears, Monk never signed and remained an amateur athlete.

Monk returned to the University shortly after the departure of Montrell McDonald. McDonald left the team on his own accord after the South Alabama game.

Jason Henry was held out of six games for undisclosed disciplinary issues.
Courtney Fortson was suspended on February 12 by John Pelphrey for an undisclosed disciplinary issue. He missed the Kentucky game on February 14, but returned to action four days later against LSU.
Marcus Monk was kept out of the January 24 game against Auburn with questions about his eligibility. Monk did not play again for the Razorbacks, and AD Jeff Long issued a release on February 13 stating that Monk is no longer with the team. Monk had completed his undergraduate degree.
Brandon Moore was suspended after an arrest for DUI on January 18, 2009. He would not return to play until January 31 against LSU, and would not score until the February 7 contest at Mississippi State.

2008–09 schedule and results
Retrieved from arkansasrazorbacks.com

|-
!colspan=9| Regular season

|-
!colspan=9| 2009 SEC men's basketball tournament

Awards and honors
Courtney Fortson
SEC Player of the Week
Freshman Player of the Week
All-SEC, Freshman team
Michael Washington
SEC Player of the Week
All-SEC, second team – Associated Press, SEC coaches
All-District VII – United States Basketball Writers Association
All-District 21, second team – National Association of Basketball Coaches

See also
 Arkansas Razorbacks men's basketball
 John Pelphrey, head coach in his second year with the Hogs
 2009 NCAA Men's Division I Basketball Tournament
 2008-09 NCAA Division I men's basketball season
 The National Championship 1993–94 team, which returned for the March 1 game against Georgia.

References

External links
Arkansas Razorbacks men's basketball official website

Arkansas
Arkansas Razorbacks men's basketball seasons
Arkansas Razorbacks men's b
Arkansas Razorbacks men's b